Arthur Nussbaum (January 31, 1877 – November 22, 1964) was a German-born American jurist. He studied legal science in Berlin from 1894 till 1897. He taught at Humboldt University of Berlin (1918–1933).  In 1934, he moved to the United States, and in 1940, he became a US citizen.

He taught at Columbia Law School from 1934 until his formal retirement in 1951.

Selected bibliography 
 
 
 Das neue deutsche Wirtschaftsrecht : eine systematische Übersicht über die Entwicklung des Privatrechts und der benachbarten Rechtsgebiete seit Ausbruch des Weltkrieges, Berlin, Springer, 1920
 Deutsches internationales Privatrecht, 1932
 
 Principles of private international law, 1942

References

External links

American legal scholars
American legal writers
Jurists from Berlin
German legal scholars
Columbia University faculty
Jewish emigrants from Nazi Germany to the United States
1877 births
1964 deaths